Stephen A. M. Hester (born 14 December 1960) is an international businessman and former banker. He is Chairman of Nordea Bank and easyJet and former chief executive officer (CEO) of RSA Insurance Group, of RBS Group and of British Land.

Early life
Hester is the eldest son of Ronald, a chemistry professor at the University of York, and Dr Bridget Hester, a psychotherapist. He was born in Ithaca, NY, USA but grew up primarily in the village of Crayke in North Yorkshire. He was educated at Easingwold School in North Yorkshire a rural comprehensive school, and at Oxford where he studied at Lady Margaret Hall, and after chairing the Tory Reform Group, graduated with a first class honours degree in Philosophy, Politics and Economics.

Career

Hester has had an extensive business career including holding the Chief Executive position at three FTSE 100 companies over a 17 year period. He began his career in 1982 with investment bank Credit Suisse First Boston, where he started in corporate finance and then served a year as the chairman's assistant. He was appointed a Director in 1987 and a Managing Director in 1988 aged 27. Following stints as co-head European M&A and Investment Banking, in 1996 he was appointed to the Executive Board. Hester held the position of Chief Financial Officer and Head of Support Division, until May 2000. From May 2000 to September 2001, he was Global Head of the Fixed Income Division.

In May 2002, he joined Abbey National as Finance Director. The bank had significant financial problems stemming from its wholesale and life insurance activities. As part of its significant restructuring , he was given additional responsibilities as Chief Operating Officer for the wholesale and insurance arms of the bank as well as its support functions. The restructuring was successful and in 2004 the bank was sold at a significant gain to shareholders to Santander.

In November 2004, Hester was appointed Chief Executive of the FTSE 100 property company British Land succeeding Sir John Ritblat the company’s founder. During Hester’s tenure the company was reshaped, dividends increased 125% and EPS doubled.

Hester was appointed non-executive deputy chairman of the newly nationalised Northern Rock by Chancellor of the Exchequer Alistair Darling in March 2008, a role which he resigned from in September 2008 to take a non-executive position on the board of Royal Bank of Scotland.

Royal Bank of Scotland
In October 2008, RBS , then the biggest bank in the world by assets, fell victim to the global financial crisis and needed recapitalisation by the UK Government. As part of that change, Hester was asked to leave British Land and replace Fred Goodwin as Chief Executive of the RBS Group.

The ensuing five years were ones of intense restructuring of RBS. Assets were reduced by some £720 billion and costs by c£4.2 billion. The task had been likened to defusing a financial bomb. In addition to restoring financial health the share price of RBS which had troughed at 90p equivalent, rose to 330p by the time he left the bank.

Hester was paid an annual salary of £1.1 million by RBS. In 2012 he was offered a bonus of just under £1 million, but following some considerable pressure from politicians and the public, he declined the bonus. Later in 2012, in June, he declined his bonus for the following year after RBS's computer problems.

On 12 June 2013 Royal Bank of Scotland announced that Hester would be stepping down as CEO in December 2013, after five years with the bank.

RSA Insurance
On 4 February 2014, Hester joined RSA Insurance Group, the FTSE100 insurer, as CEO. The company was also experiencing a financial crisis and Hester led significant restructuring efforts , streamlining and focusing the business, raising £750 million in a rights issue and changing management whilst cutting costs. The insurer responded well to these changes with substantial increases in earnings, dividends and share price. The Company accepted an all cash bid worth £7.2 bn in June 2021 from Intact of Canada and Tryg of Denmark. The 52% premium was a record for the sector.

In June 2016 Hester was also appointed to the Board of Centrica the FTSE 100 energy Group as Senior Independent Director which he stepped down from in June 2022.

Recent Business Activity

Hester joined the Board of easyJet, the leading European airline, on 1st September 2021 becoming Chairman on 1st December 2021. He also was appointed Lead Independent Director of Kyndryl in November 2021. Kyndryl is a New York based and listed company spun off from IBM. It is the largest IT infrastructure provider globally.
On 1st April 2022 Hester joined the Board of Nordea Bank abp as Vice Chairman, and became Chairman on 1st October 2022. Nordea is the largest bank in the Nordics and the 5th largest European bank by value.

Personal life
Hester married Canadian-born Barbara Abt in 1991, and they have two children together. They met when both were working for Credit Suisse. They separated and divorced in 2010.

In September 2012, Hester married Suzy Neubert, a former banker and wealth manager for the fund manager J.O. Hambro. It was a second marriage for both of them.

Hester bought the 400-acre Broughton Grange estate in Oxfordshire in 1992. One of Hester's passions is said to be development of the gardens and arboretum at Broughton Grange, part of which was designed by landscape architect Tom Stuart-Smith and includes pleached limes, formal beds and five of the first Australian Wollemi pines to be brought into the UK.

For nine years Hester was a trustee of the Foundation and Friends of the Royal Botanic Gardens, Kew.

Hester has in the past donated to the Conservative Party.

Hester enjoys tennis, running and shooting, as well as skiing, for which he owns a chalet in Verbier, Switzerland. Hester also used to enjoy horse riding, as his first wife was a master of fox hounds in Warwickshire.

References

External links
Broughton Grange website

|-

1960 births
Living people
Alumni of Lady Margaret Hall, Oxford
English chief executives
NatWest Group people
English bankers
People from Easingwold
Chief operating officers
British Land people